Ivan Stanković may refer to:

Ivan Stanković (footballer, born 1976)
Ivan Stanković (footballer, born 1983)
Ivan Stanković (handballer)